Galiyevka is a rural locality (a khutor) in Zalimanskoye Rural Settlement, Bogucharsky District, Voronezh Oblast, Russia. The population was 603 as of 2010. There are 9 streets.

Geography 
Galiyevka is located 7 km northeast of Boguchar (the district's administrative centre) by road. Zaliman is the nearest rural locality.

References 

Rural localities in Bogucharsky District